Fiona Sze-Lorrain (born 1980) is a French writer, musician, poet, literary translator, and editor.

Early life and education 
Born in Singapore, Sze-Lorrain grew up trilingual and has lived mostly in Paris and New York City. She spent her childhood in a hybrid of cultures, and her formative years in the United States and France. She began studying classical piano and guzheng at a young age. A graduate of Columbia University, she obtained her master's degree from New York University and attended the École Normale de Musique de Paris before earning a PhD in French from the Paris-Sorbonne University.

Work
Sze-Lorrain's work involves fiction, poetry, translation, music, and the visual arts. She writes mainly in English, and translates from Chinese and French. She has written for venues related to fashion journalism, music and art criticism, and dramaturgy.

In 2007, she worked with Gao Xingjian on a book of photography, essays, and poetry based on his film Silhouette/Shadow.

Through Mark Strand, whom she would later translate into French, she found her poetic vocation. The Rumpus notes, "As a French woman of post-colonial Asian heritage, she joins a vein of writers such as Marguerite Duras and Samuel Beckett whose work straddles profound cultural complexities. Educated in America, Sze-Lorrain spent several years in New York before settling back in France where she started publishing poems in English, translating French and contemporary Chinese poetry into English, and American poetry into French. Her work serves as a vital midwife for the greater global understanding that will one day be born from today’s contracting and relaxing tensions between differing religions, cultures, and languages." Sze-Lorrain's debut poetry collection, Water the Moon, appeared in 2010, followed by My Funeral Gondola in 2013. Prairie Schooner describes her work as an "arc" that "navigates the sense of otherness" with poems that "burst at the seams with the customs, gastronomy, ancestry, literature, and art of the two cultures." Her third collection The Ruined Elegance was published by Princeton University Press in the Princeton Series of Contemporary Poets in 2016 and was named one of Library Journal's Best Books in Poetry for 2015. It was also a finalist for the 2016 Los Angeles Times Book Prize.

Published during the COVID-19 pandemic, her fourth collection Rain in Plural (Princeton University Press, 2020) contains many "poems that resonate with a political undertone, and they often suggest in the midst of great threats we persist and continue our important work, aware we alone are not the only or even the most vulnerable. The poems care about the larger world and our current crises."

Sze-Lorrain is one of the recognized translators of contemporary Chinese poetry. Her work was shortlisted for the 2020 Derek Walcott Prize for Poetry and the 2016 Best Translated Book Award, and longlisted for the 2014 PEN Award for Poetry in Translation. She is a co-founder of Cerise Press (2009–13) and a corresponding editor of Mānoa (2012–14), and an editor at Vif Éditions. 

The recipient of fellowships from Yaddo, Ledig House, and the Helene Wurlitzer Foundation, she is the inaugural writer-in-residence at MALBA in Buenos Aires. She has also served as a visiting poet at various colleges and universities in United States and Europe. She is a 2019-20 Abigail R. Cohen Fellow at the Columbia Institute for Ideas and Imagination.

Sze-Lorrain studies calligraphy and ink. Her poems and translations, handwritten in ink, were exhibited alongside ink drawings by Fritz Horstman from the Josef and Anni Albers Foundation in the art show, A Blue Dark, at The Institute Library (New Haven) in 2019.

In response to the pandemic in Paris, Sze-Lorrain wrote a setting of new poems The Year of the Rat, set to music by Peter Child for unaccompanied voices, and virtually premiered in February 2021 by the solo artists of the Cantata Singers and Ensemble in Boston.

As a classical zheng harpist, Fiona Sze-Lorrain has performed worldwide. Her concert venues include Carnegie Hall, Merkin Concert Hall, World Music Hall of Wesleyan University, Maison des cultures du monde, Zuiderpershuis Wereldculturen centrum, Rasa Wereldculturencentrum, UNESCO World Heritage Centre, Musée Cernuschi, and the Orbigny-Bernon Museum.

Personal life
Sze-Lorrain lives in Paris with her husband Philippe Lorrain, a French independent publisher.

Publications

Poetry
 Rain in Plural, 2020. 
 The Ruined Elegance, 2016. 
 Invisible Eye, 2015. 
 My Funeral Gondola, 2013. 
 Water the Moon, 2010.

Chapbook
 Not Meant as Poems, 2018.

Collaboration
 The Year of the Rat, set to music by Peter Child, premiered by Amy Lieberman, Xiao Shi, Sheryl Krevsky Elkin, and Karyl Ryczek from the Cantata Singers and Ensemble, 2021.
 A Blue Dark with Fritz Horstman, 2019.

Translations
Moonlight Rests on My Left Palm: Poems and Essays by Yu Xiuhua, 2021. 
Green Mountain by Yang Jian, 2020. 
Karma by Yin Lichuan, 2020. 
My Mountain Country by Ye Lijun, 2019. 
 Trace by Yu Xiang, 2017. 
 Sea Summit by Yi Lu, 2016.  
 Chariots of Women by Amang, 2016.  
 A Tree Planted in Summer by Ling Yu, 2015. 
 Writing before Sleep by Na Ye, 2015. 
 The City Is a Novel by photographer Alexey Titarenko, with essays by Gabriel Bauret, Sean Corcoran, and Brett Abbott, 2015. 
 Canyon in the Body by Lan Lan, 2014. 
 Nails by Lan Lan, 2013. 
 I Can Almost See the Clouds of Dust by Yu Xiang, 2013. 
 Wind Says by Bai Hua, 2012. 
 Presque invisible (Almost Invisible) by Mark Strand, 2012. 
 Low Key by Yu Xiang, 2011. 
 Mingus, méditations by Auxeméry, 2011 
 "Ghérasim Luca Portfolio" by Ghérasim Luca in Poetry International, 2010. 
 "The Way of the Wandering Bird" by Gao Xingjian, with Ned Burgess, in Silhouette/Shadow: The Cinematic Art of Gao Xingjian, 2007.

Edited/Co-edited
 Starry Island: New Writing from Singapore, 2014. 
 On Freedom: Spirit, Art, and State, 2013. 
 Sky Lanterns: New Poetry from China, Formosa, and Beyond, 2012. 
 Cerise Press: A Journal of Literature, Arts & Culture, Vol. 1 Issue 1-Vol. 5 Issue 13, 2009-2013. ISSN 1946-5262
 Silhouette/Shadow: The Cinematic Art of Gao Xingjian, 2007. 
 Interculturalism: Exploring Critical Issues, 2004.

CD
 Une seule prise (In One Take), 2010. UPC 3-760201-400005
Film
 Rain in Plural . . . and Beyond, 2021. Columbia Institute for Ideas and Imagination.

Awards and honors
 2021 Derek Walcott Prize for Poetry Finalist
 2020 Derek Walcott Prize for Poetry Finalist
 2016 Los Angeles Times Book Prize Finalist
 2016 Best Translated Book Award Finalist
 2014 PEN Award for Poetry in Translation Longlisted
 2014 New Generation Indie Book Awards Finalist
 2011 Eric Hoffer Book Award Honorable Mention

References

External links
 Fiona Sze-Lorrain's website
 Vif Éditions
 Review of Water the Moon in Open Letters Monthly 
 Review of My Funeral Gondola in The Rumpus
 About Fiona Sze-Lorrain and Translation
 Interview with Fiona Sze-Lorrain 
 Sze-Lorrain's Translation of Yu Xiang's I Can Almost See the Clouds of Dust  in Time Out Beijing

1980 births
Living people
Chinese–English translators
Columbia College (New York) alumni
Contemporary classical music performers
English-language poets
French musicians
French poets
French translators
French–English translators
Guzheng players
New York University alumni
University of Paris alumni
Writers from New York City
Writers from Paris
21st-century French women writers
21st-century translators
Singaporean emigrants